The 2017 P&G U.S. National Gymnastics Championships is the 54th edition of the U.S. National Gymnastics Championships. The competition was held from August 17–20, 2017 at the Honda Center in Anaheim, California.

Competition schedule 

The competition featured Senior and Junior competitions for both women's and men's disciplines. The competition was as follows:

Thursday, August 17: Men's gymnastics — 1 p.m., juniors, and 7 p.m., seniors

Friday, August 18: Women's gymnastics — 1 p.m., juniors, and 7:30 p.m., seniors

Saturday, August 19: Men's gymnastics – 12 p.m., juniors, and 5 p.m., seniors

Sunday, August 20: Women's gymnastics – 11 a.m., juniors, and 3:30 p.m., seniors

Sponsorship 

Procter & Gamble, a multinational consumer goods company, is the title sponsor of the event.

Medalists

National team
The top 6 all-around females made the national team. For seniors, this consisted of Ragan Smith, Jordan Chiles. Riley McCusker, Trinity Thomas, Margzetta Frazier, and Morgan Hurd.  Additionally, Jade Carey, the vault champion and floor silver medalist, and Ashton Locklear, the uneven bars silver medalist, were also named to the team.  For juniors, Maile O'Keefe, Emma Malabuyo, Kara Eaker, Adeline Kenlin, Audrey Davis, and Leanne Wong were the top six all-around finishers. Additionally, uneven bars bronze medalist Gabby Perea was also named to the national team.

Participants 
The following individuals are participating in competition:

References 

U.S. National Gymnastics Championships
Gymnastics in California
Sports competitions in Anaheim, California
U.S. Open
U.S. Open
U.S. Open